The former Roman Catholic Diocese of Ypres, in present-day Belgium, existed from 1559 to 1801. Its seat was Saint Martin's Cathedral in Ypres.  In 1969 it was reconstituted as a titular see.

History
The diocese was originally part of the Diocese of Thérouanne, which had been established in the 7th or 8th century. In 1553 Charles V, Holy Roman Emperor besieged the city of Thérouanne, then a French enclave in the Holy Roman Empire, in revenge for a defeat by the French at Metz. After he captured Thérouanne, he razed the city. In 1557, as a result of the war damage to its see, the diocese was abolished. This led to a reform of sees at the Council of Trent and the bishopric of Thérouanne was split between the Diocese of Saint-Omer, the Diocese of Boulogne and the Diocese of Ypres. With this, Saint Martin's Church was elevated to cathedral status, as it became the see of the new diocese.

After the Concordat of 1801 between Napoleon and Pope Pius VII, Ypres was incorporated into the Diocese of Ghent, and Saint Martin's lost its status as a cathedral.

Cornelius Jansen, the father of the theological movement Jansenism, was Bishop of Ypres from 1635 to 1638.

Bishops
Martin Rythovius 1561–1583
Petrus Simons 1584–1605
Charles Maes 1607–1610, also bishop of Ghent
Jean de Visscher 1611–1613
Antoine de Haynin 1614–1626
George Chamberlain 1627–1634
Cornelius Jansen (Jansenius) 1635–1638
Josse Bouckaert  1641–1646
Josse Croy 1647
Ambrosius Capello 1647 (also bishop of Antwerp)
N. 1647
Jean-François de Robles 1654–1659
Martin Prats 1665–1671
Henri of Halmale 1672–1676
Guillaume Herincx (O.F.M.) 1677-1678
Jacques de Lière 1679 (not confirmed by the Pope)
Martin de Ratabon 1693–1713, (also bishop of Viviers)
Ch.-Fr.-Guy de Laval-Montmorency 06/05/1713–26/08/1713
Jean-Baptiste de Smet 1718–1732 (also bishop of Ghent)
Guillaume Delvaux 1732–1761
Félix-Jo.-Hubert de Wavrans 1762–1784
Charles-Alexandre D'Arberg 1786–1801, died 1809, last bishop

Titular bishops and archbishops
 Joseph Mees 1969-2001, archbishop, (Apostolic Nuncio to South Africa 1985-1987)
 Gustaaf Joos 2003-2003, archbishop, (Cardinal - Deacon of S. Pier Damiani ai Monti di S. Paolo)
 Jacques André Blaquart 2006-2010, bishop (auxiliary bishop of Bordeaux, Bishop of Orléans)
 Jean Kockerols 2011-, bishop (auxiliary bishop of Mechelen-Brussels)

Notes

Ypres